For king and country and similar may refer to:
 For King & Country (band), formerly "Joel & Luke", a Christian pop-rock band
 "For King and Country", a module for the game Advanced Squad Leader
 "For King & Country", episode 34 of Sanctuary

See also
 For God and Country (disambiguation)
 King and Country, a 1964 British war film
 The King and Country debate, in 1933 at the Oxford Union debating society
 King & Country (company), manufacturer of military miniatures
 Queen and Country (disambiguation)